Clepsis octogona is a species of moth of the family Tortricidae. It is found in Uganda.

The larvae feed on Ulex europaeus.

References

Endemic fauna of Uganda
Moths described in 1965
Clepsis